Lenos Georgiou (born 18 September 1992 in Larnaca, Cyprus) is a Cypriot football forward who last played for Aspis Pylas in the Cypriot Fourth Division. Georgiou is a product of the academies of AEK Larnaca.

External links

CFA profile

1992 births
Living people
Cypriot footballers
Association football forwards
Greek Cypriot people
AEK Larnaca FC players
Cypriot First Division players